Wild hyssop may refer to:

 Agastache cana, a plant in the family Lamiaceae native to New Mexico and Texas
 Hyssopus, a genus of plants in the family Lamiaceae native to Europe
 Verbena officinalis, a plant in the family Verbenaceae native to Europe and naturalized in North America